Rinaldo Nocentini (born 25 September 1977) is an Italian former professional racing cyclist, who competed professionally between 1999 and 2019 for the , , Formaggi Pinzolo Fiavé,  and  teams.

In the 2009 Tour de France, his first participation in the race, he became leader in the General Classification after participating in a stage-long breakaway on stage 7 to take the yellow jersey from Fabian Cancellara with an overall time six seconds ahead of the second-place rider in the General Classification, Alberto Contador. He wore the yellow jersey for eight stages before relinquishing it to Contador at the end of stage 15.

Major results

1995
 3rd  Road race, UCI Junior Road World Championships
1998
 2nd  Road race, UCI Under-23 Road World Championships
 2nd Gran Premio Industrie del Marmo
1999
 Tour de Langkawi
1st Stages 9 & 10
2002
 5th Giro di Toscana
2003
 1st Giro della Toscana
 6th Overall Tour of Austria
1st  Mountains classification
 6th GP Industria & Artigianato di Larciano
 6th Gran Premio Città di Camaiore
2004
 1st Stage 5 Tour de Pologne
 3rd Giro dell'Appennino
 3rd Giro dell'Emilia
 4th GP Industria & Artigianato di Larciano
 5th Giro del Lazio
 6th Giro del Veneto
 10th Gran Premio di Chiasso
 10th Gran Premio di Lugano
 10th Giro di Toscana
2005
 1st Subida al Naranco
 2nd Coppa Sabatini
 3rd Gran Premio Città di Camaiore
 5th Tre Valli Varesine
 6th Overall Regio-Tour
 6th Giro del Veneto
 6th Trofeo Melinda
 7th Coppa Ugo Agostoni
 9th Overall Tour of Austria
 9th Giro del Lazio
2006
 1st Giro dell'Appennino
 1st Giro del Veneto
 1st Coppa Placci
 2nd Gran Premio Fred Mengoni
 2nd Tre Valli Varesine
 3rd Trofeo Laigueglia
 4th Giro d'Oro
 4th Giro di Toscana
 5th Overall Tour Méditerranéen
 6th Coppa Sabatini
 8th Trofeo Matteotti
 9th Trofeo Melinda
2007
 1st GP Miguel Induráin
 1st Stage 4 Tour Méditerranéen
 6th La Flèche Wallonne
 7th GP Ouest–France
2008
 1st Gran Premio di Lugano
 2nd Overall Paris–Nice
 2nd Tour du Haut Var
 4th Overall Tour Méditerranéen
 7th Milan–San Remo
 10th Giro dell'Emilia
2009
 1st Stage 7 Tour of California
 7th Grand Prix de Plumelec-Morbihan
 9th Overall Critérium International
 10th La Flèche Wallonne
 Tour de France
Held  from Stages 7–14
2010
 1st Stage 1 Tour du Haut Var
 2nd Overall Tour Méditerranéen
2011
 3rd Overall Tour du Haut Var
 3rd Gran Premio dell'Insubria-Lugano
 6th Overall Tour de Pologne
 7th Gran Premio di Lugano
 9th Grand Prix Cycliste de Montréal
 10th GP Miguel Induráin
2012
 4th Overall Tirreno–Adriatico
 5th Overall Critérium International
 6th Overall Tour de Pologne
 6th Overall Tour of Beijing
 9th Overall Tour Méditerranéen
 9th Amstel Gold Race
2013
 3rd Strade Bianche
 3rd Gran Premio Città di Camaiore
 4th Gran Premio della Costa Etruschi
 5th Overall Tour of Oman
 10th La Flèche Wallonne
2014
 2nd Milano–Torino
 8th Overall Tour of Beijing
 10th Giro di Lombardia
2016
 1st  Overall Troféu Joaquim Agostinho
 2nd Overall Tour d'Azerbaïdjan
 8th Overall Settimana Internazionale di Coppi e Bartali
2017
 2nd Overall Volta ao Alentejo
1st Stage 1
 2nd Overall Troféu Joaquim Agostinho
 2nd Clássica Aldeias do Xisto
 3rd Road race, National Road Championships
 4th Overall Volta a Portugal
 9th Overall Volta ao Algarve
2018
 6th Overall La Tropicale Amissa Bongo
1st Stages 3 & 6

Grand Tour general classification results timeline

References

External links

 
 

Italian male cyclists
1977 births
Living people
Sportspeople from the Province of Arezzo
Cyclists from Tuscany